Petkov, feminine Petkova is a Bulgarian surname derived from the first name Petko. It may refer to:
 Dimitar Petkov (1856-1907), Bulgarian politician, Mayor of Sofia, Prime Minister, assassinated
 Dobrin Petkov, Bulgarian conductor
 Eva Petkova, Bulgarian-American biostatistician
 Georgi Petkov (footballer, born 1976), Bulgarian football goalkeeper
 Georgi Petkov (footballer, born 1988), Bulgarian football defender
 Georgi Petkov (rower) (born 1956), Bulgarian Olympic rower
 Gergana Petkova
 Irena Petkova, a Bulgarian singer
 Ivaylo Petkov (born 1976), Bulgarian footballer
 Kiril Petkov (born 1980), Bulgarian politician, Prime Minister of Bulgaria from December 2021 to August 2022
 Mario Petkov
 Mariya Petkova (born 1950), a retired Bulgarian discus thrower
 Martin Petkov (footballer, born 2001), Bulgarian football winger for Lokomotiv Gorna Oryahovitsa on loan from Levski Sofia
 Martin Petkov (footballer, born 2002), Bulgarian football winger for Levski Sofia
 Milen Petkov (born 1974), Bulgarian footballer
 Nedelya Petkova (1826–1894), a Bulgarian education pioneer
 Nicolai Petkov (born 1956), Bulgarian computer scientist
 Nikola Petkov (1893-1947), Bulgarian politician and son of Dimitar, leading anti-Communist following World War II, executed
 Ogniana Petkova (born 1964), a Bulgarian sprint canoer and 1998 Olympic bronze medallist
 Petko Petkov (footballer) (1946−2020), Bulgarian football player and manager
 Petko Petkov (football manager) (born 1968), Bulgarian  football manager and former player
 Petko Petkov (volleyball) (born 1958), Bulgarian former volleyball player
 Rossen Petkov
 Stoyan Petkov (1886–1972), since 1947 Andrey, Metropolitan of New York
 Temenuzhka Petkova (born 1967), Bulgarian politician, Minister of Energy of Bulgaria since 2014
 Vladimir Petkov (born 1971), Bulgarian chess grandmaster
 Zhivko Petkov

See also
 

Bulgarian-language surnames